Darío Jesús Zárate (born 22 May 1977 in Córdoba) is an Argentine footballer. He has played for a number of clubs in Argentina.

External links
 Darío Zárate at BDFA.com.ar 

1977 births
Living people
Footballers from Córdoba, Argentina
Argentine footballers
Association football forwards
Club Atlético Belgrano footballers
Nueva Chicago footballers
Racing de Córdoba footballers
Talleres de Córdoba footballers
Defensa y Justicia footballers
Aldosivi footballers
América de Cali footballers
Argentine expatriate footballers
9 de Julio de Rafaela players